Quentin Tarantino is an American filmmaker, who has directed ten films. He first began his career in the 1980s by directing and writing Love Birds In Bondage and writing, directing and starring in the black-and-white My Best Friend's Birthday, a partially lost amateur short film which was never officially released. He impersonated musician Elvis Presley in a small role in the sitcom The Golden Girls (1988), and briefly appeared in Eddie Presley (1992). As an independent filmmaker, he directed, wrote, and appeared in the crime thriller Reservoir Dogs (1992), which tells the story of six strangers brought together for a jewelry heist. Proving to be Tarantino's breakthrough film, it was named the greatest independent film of all time by Empire. Tarantino's screenplay for Tony Scott's True Romance (1993) was nominated for a Saturn Award. Also in 1993, he served as an executive producer for Killing Zoe and wrote two other films.

In 1994, Tarantino wrote and directed the neo-noir black comedy Pulp Fiction, a major critical and commercial success. Cited in the media as a defining film of modern Hollywood, the film earned Tarantino an Academy Award for Best Original Screenplay and a Best Director nomination. The following year, Tarantino directed The Man from Hollywood, one of the four segments of the anthology film Four Rooms, and an episode of ER, entitled "Motherhood". He wrote Robert Rodriguez's From Dusk till Dawn (1996)—one of the many collaborations between them—which attained cult status and spawned several sequels, in which they served as executive producers. Tarantino's next directorial ventures Jackie Brown (1997) and Kill Bill (2003–2004) were met with critical acclaim. The latter, a two-part martial arts film (Volume 1 and Volume 2), follows a former assassin seeking revenge on her ex-colleagues who attempted to kill her.

Tarantino's direction of "Grave Danger", a CSI: Crime Scene Investigation episode, garnered him a Primetime Emmy Award for Outstanding Directing for a Drama Series nomination. He directed a scene in Frank Miller and Rodriguez's Sin City (2005). Tarantino and Rodriguez later collaborated in the double feature Grindhouse (2007); Tarantino directed the segment Death Proof. He next penned and directed the war film Inglourious Basterds (2009), a fictionalized account of the Nazi occupation of France during World War II. The critically and commercially successful film earned Tarantino two nominations at the 82nd Academy Awards—Best Director and Best Original Screenplay. His greatest commercial success came with the 2012 Western film Django Unchained, which is about a slave revolt in the Antebellum South. Earning $425.4million worldwide, it won him another Academy Award for Best Original Screenplay. Tarantino then wrote and directed another commercially successful Western film, The Hateful Eight (2015), whose screenplay was nominated for a BAFTA Award and a Golden Globe Award. He wrote the 2019 drama Once Upon A Time In Hollywood, which follows a fading actor and his stunt double as they navigate 1969 Hollywood. The film was nominated for 10 Academy Awards, including Best Picture.

Film

Executive producer only

Acting roles and documentary appearances

Television

Acting roles

Video games
 1996: Steven Spielberg's Director's Chair as Jack Cavello

Notes

References

Director filmographies
Filmography
Male actor filmographies
American filmographies